Georgetown University School of Medicine, a medical school opened in 1851, is one of Georgetown University's five graduate schools. It is located on Reservoir Road in the Georgetown neighborhood of  Washington, DC, adjacent to the University's main campus.  The School of Medicine works in association with the 609-bed MedStar Georgetown University Hospital, MedStar Washington Hospital Center, and nine other affiliated federal and community hospitals in the Washington metropolitan area. Georgetown is the oldest Catholic medical school in the United States.

The School is part of the Georgetown University Medical Center, which comprises roughly 80% of the research initiatives occurring at Georgetown University as a whole. It is the closest academic medical center in proximity to the National Institutes of Health. Georgetown and the NIH offer a combined GU-NIH PhD program in biomedical research to foster direct collaboration between the neighboring institutions.

The School is ranked No. 44 (tie) in Best Medical Schools: Research and No. 87 in Best Medical Schools: Primary Care in the 2021 rankings by U S News & World Report, as well as tied for second most selective medical school in the United States.

Technology leading to the introduction of the HPV vaccine, was developed at Georgetown Medical Center by Richard Schlegel.

History

In 1849, four Catholic doctors frustrated with what they felt were discriminatory practices at neighboring Columbian College, limiting Catholic doctors' access to the clinical facilities of the Washington Infirmary, petitioned Georgetown President James A. Ryder to found a medical program. Classes commenced in May 1851 and were only held at night until 1895. In 1852, the school awarded its first medical doctorates.

In 1898 the Georgetown University Hospital was established. A dental department was created in 1901, which became independent of the School of Medicine in 1951 as the School of Dentistry. In 1930, classes moved to the main campus. In July 2000, Georgetown University and MedStar Health, a not-for-profit organization of seven Baltimore and Washington hospitals, entered into a clinical partnership to provide management of clinical care and clinical education at Georgetown University Hospital. In 2004, the School of Medicine opened the Integrated Learning Center (ILC), which supports the School of Medicine's emphasis on a patient-centered, competence-based curriculum and provides the latest methods of clinical teaching and evaluation.

Curriculum

The Georgetown University School of Medicine Faculty includes 1,638 faculty members from 8 basic science and 16 clinical departments, an NCI-designated Comprehensive Cancer Center, and two Interdisciplinary Training Program Grants funded by the NIH – one in Neuroscience, and one in Tumor Biology.

The School of Medicine offers an MD with a Research Track where MD students spend time in the laboratory and develop a research thesis in their specialty. This is different from the MD/PhD program, which is longer and requires a PhD thesis.

The School of Medicine and the Graduate School of Arts & Sciences cooperate to offer a combined-degree program that leads to an MD and a PhD in a chosen concentration. A spot is reserved in this program each year for one student interested in pursuing a Philosophy & Bioethics PhD; all other spots are undifferentiated but must be directed toward a scientific specialty. Research at Georgetown is especially strong in the areas of cancer and the neurosciences. Other combined degree programs include BA/MD (early selection route for Georgetown University undergraduates), MD/MBA, and MD/MS.

Programs

 Anesthesia
 Biochemistry & Molecular Biology
 Biomathematics & Statistics
 Cell Biology
 Dermatology
 Emergency Medicine
 Family Medicine
 Graduate Biomedical Education
 Medicine
 Microbiology & Immunology
 Neurology
 Neurosurgery
 Obstetrics & Gynecology
 Oncology

 Ophthalmology
 Orthopaedic Surgery
 Otolaryngology
 Pathology
 Pediatrics
 Pharmacology
 Physiology & Biophysics
 Psychiatry
 Radiation Medicine
 Radiology
 Surgery
 Urology

Campus

Georgetown University Medical Center comprises the School of Medicine, School of Nursing & Health Studies (founded in 1903), Georgetown Lombardi Comprehensive Cancer Center and Biomedical Graduate Education. In 2008, GUMC brought in $132 million in sponsored research funds, most of which was federally funded. Clinical care is provided at MedStar Georgetown University Hospital and other locations through a partnership with MedStar Health.

List of deans

Notable alumni

References

Citations

Sources

External links
Georgetown University School of Medicine

Georgetown University Medical Center
Georgetown University schools
Medical schools in Washington, D.C.
Catholic health care
Educational institutions established in 1851
1851 establishments in Washington, D.C.